"Never Too Much" is the debut song written, composed, produced, and performed by Luther Vandross. The R&B song was released in 1981, as the lead single from Vandross's debut album of the same name. The title track hit number one on the US Billboard Hot R&B/Hip-Hop Songs chart, reached number four on the US Billboard Dance Club Songs chart, and peaked at number 33 on the US Billboard Hot 100.

The album (Vandross' first as a solo artist) was very popular, especially with Black Radio and R&B Charts. It received several accolades, including two Grammy Award nominations in 1982—"Best New Artist" and "Best R&B Vocal Performance, Male" A remixed version of the song reached number 13 on the UK singles chart in November 1989.

The single is also included on his later album The Ultimate Luther Vandross, which was released in 2001. The single was released alongside a music video in which he is shown singing in a recording studio.

Vandross received a nomination for "Never Too Much" at the 24th Grammy Awards (1982) in the category, 'Best R&B Vocal Performance, Male'. "Never Too Much" was ranked number 466 on Rolling Stone'''s list of The 500 Greatest Songs of All Time in September 2021.

 Track listings 
U.S. 1981 7" single
 "Never Too Much" – 3:50
 "You Stopped Loving Me" – 4:59

UK 1981 7" single
 "Never Too Much" – 3:50
 "Don't You Know That?" – 4:04

UK 1981 12" single
 "Never Too Much" (Extended Version) – 5:38
 "Sugar and Spice (I Found Me a Girl)" – 4:57
 "Don't You Know That?" – 4:04

UK 1989 7" single
 "Never Too Much" (Remix '89 by Justin Strauss) – 4:02
 "The Glow of Love" – 6:10

UK 1989 12" single
 "Never Too Much" (Extended Remix '89 by Justin Strauss) – 6:42
 "Never Too Much" (Original Remix '81 a.k.a. Extended Version) – 5:38
 "The Glow of Love" – 6:10

UK 1989 alternative 12" single
 "Never Too Much" (Ben Liebrand Mix) – 7:30
 "Never Too Much" (Alternate Vocal Mix '89 by Justin Strauss) – 6:49
 "Never Too Much" (Original 7" Version) – 3:50

Charts

Certifications

Samples and cover versions
Samples
 The song, without Vandross's vocals, was sampled by Will Smith (who was then known as The Fresh Prince) in "Can't Wait to Be with You" on his and Jeffrey A. Townes's hit album Code Red (1993). Smith (by that time a.k.a. Big Will) also used the vocal melody and lyrics from the song's chorus in "1,000 Kisses" on his 2002 album Born to Reign.
 Teddy Riley protege rapper Queen Pen sampled the same song on the track "All My Love" produced by Riley from her 1997 debut album My Melody.
 Keyshia Cole sampled the same song on the Eve-assisted track "Never" from her 2005 debut album The Way It Is.
 Fat Joe, DJ Khaled and Amorphous sampled the song for their 2021 single "Sunshine (The Light)"

Cover versions
 Guitarist Craig T. Cooper covered the song for his 1996 album Romantic Letter.
 In 1997, contemporary jazz guitarist Richard Smith recorded a take for the album First Kiss.
 In 2004, jazz guitarist Paul Jackson Jr. recorded a cover for the Vandross tribute album Forever, for Always, for Luther.
 In 2005, the selection was covered by Mary J. Blige for another Vandross tribute album entitled So Amazing: An All-Star Tribute to Luther Vandross.
 In 2013, vocalist Tracy Hamlin covered the song for her album This Is My Life.
 In 2014, John "Jon Jon" Harreld, of the R&B group Troop, covered the song in tribute to Vandross, and released the song as a single.
 In 2015, Paul Kalkbrenner sampled the song in "A Million Days" on his album 7.
 In 2018, English singer Jessie J performed a cover live on the Chinese competition series Singer.

In film, television, and video games
 The first minute of this song is used in the American sitcom WKRP in Cincinnati season four episode 17 "Fire" (March 17, 1982), until it is unceremoniously cut off by Les Nessman when he reports that the Flimm Building is on fire.
 The song was used in the soundtrack for the Rockstar Games 2002 action-adventure video game Grand Theft Auto: Vice City on the in-game radio station Emotion 98.3.
 "Never Too Much" is featured on the soundtrack of the 2012 movie, Think Like a Man.
 The intro of the song is used during the announcement of the guests in the Dutch daily late night show Jinek.
 The song was used in The Simpsons Treehouse of Horror XXV includes a segment spoofing the film A Clockwork Orange''.
 The song was used in the Google Doodle celebrating Luther Vandross' 70th birthday  on April 20, 2021.
 Drag artists Willow Pill and Bosco lip-synced to the song on RuPaul's Drag Race, season 14, episode 11.

References

1981 debut singles
Luther Vandross songs
Songs written by Luther Vandross
1981 songs
Epic Records singles
Post-disco songs